Richard Skinner may refer to:

 Richard Skinner (American politician) (1778–1833), American politician, attorney, and jurist from the US state of Vermont
 Richard Skinner (broadcaster) (born 1951), British radio and television broadcaster
 Richard Skinner (MP) (died 1575), English politician